The 2020–21 Egyptian Second Division was the 41st edition of the Egyptian Second Division, the top Egyptian semi-professional level for football clubs, since its establishment in 1977. The season started on 25 November 2020 and concluded on 3 July 2021. Fixtures for the 2020–21 season were announced on 11 November 2020, two weeks before the start of the competition.

Eastern Company, Coca-Cola and Pharco won Group A, Group B and Group C respectively and secured the promotion to the 2021–22 Egyptian Premier League; all of them earning a place in the top flight for the first time in their history.

All teams that earned promotion this season are owned and named after corporations, which caused wide controversies in the football scene in Egypt because the number of teams in the next season's premier league could rise up to 12 teams, which is two third of the total number of sides in the league. The Egyptian Football Association was also heavily criticized for not applying a club naming policy that prevents companies and corporations names from being included in club's name, similar to the rule applied by the German Football Association.

Promoted clubs

Teams

Team changes
The following teams have changed division since the 2019–20 season.

To Second Division
Promoted from Third Division

KIMA Aswan
Qena
Asyut Cement
MS Samasta
Eastern Company
El Sekka El Hadid
Porto Suez
Kafr El Sheikh
Beni Ebeid
Sers El Layan
Sporting Alexandria
Al Jazeera

Relegated from Premier League

Haras El Hodoud
Tanta
ZED

From Second Division
Originally relegated to Third Division, later reprieved due to the COVID-19 pandemic in Egypt

Sohag
Media
Faiyum
Dayrout
Tahta
Nogoom
Al Merreikh
Coca-Cola
Tersana
Al Zarka
Al Hammam
Olympic Club
Baladeyet El Mahalla
Maleyat Kafr El Zayat
Biyala

Promoted to Premier League

National Bank of Egypt
Ceramica Cleopatra
Ghazl El Mahalla

Stadiums and locations
Note: Table lists in alphabetical order.

Group A

3 teams from Asyut, 3 teams from Beni Suef, 3 teams from Qena, 2 teams from Giza, 2 teams from Sohag, 1 team from Aswan, 1 team from Faiyum and 1 team from El Minya.

Group B

5 teams from Cairo, 3 teams from Suez, 2 teams from Giza, 2 teams from El Monufia, 1 team from Damietta, 1 team from El Gharbia, 1 team from Ismailia, and 1 team from Port Said.

Group C

5 teams from Alexandria, 3 teams from El Dakahlia, 3 teams from Matruh, 2 teams from El Gharbia, 2 teams from Kafr El Sheikh, and 1 team from El Beheira.

Notes

Results

League tables

Group A

Group B

Group C

Results tables

Group A

Group B

Group C

Number of teams by governorate

References

Egyptian Second Division seasons
Egypt
Egyptian Second Division
Association football events postponed due to the COVID-19 pandemic